Önsä is a rural locality (a selo) in Biektaw District, Tatarstan. The population was 338 as of 2010.

Geography 
Önsä is located 17 km north of Biektaw, district's administrative centre, and 41 km north of Qazan, republic's capital, by road.

History 
The village already existed during the period of the Khanate of Qazan.

From 18th to the first half of the 19th centuries village's residents belonged to the social estate of state peasants.

By the beginning of the twentieth century, village had a mosque, a mekteb, 2 windmills and 5 small shops.

Before the creation of the Tatar ASSR in 1920 was a part of Qazan Uyezd of Qazan Governorate. Since 1920 was a part of Arça Canton; after the creation of districts in Tatar ASSR (Tatarstan) in Döbyaz (1930–1963),  Yäşel Üzän (1963–1965) and Biektaw districts.

References

External links 
 

Rural localities in Vysokogorsky District